The 2020 Women's FA Community Shield was the ninth Women's FA Community Shield, and the first after the competition's revival following an eleven-season abeyance. As with its male equivalent, the Community Shield is an annual football match played between the winners of the previous season's league and the previous season's Women's FA Cup. However, as the 2019–20 Women's FA Cup was postponed due to the COVID-19 pandemic in the United Kingdom, the 2020 Community Shield was contested by the 2019–20 FA WSL champions Chelsea and the still-reigning 2018–19 FA Cup winners, Manchester City. Both teams were contesting their first ever Women's Community Shield.

The match was played as part of a double-header, with both the women's and men's Community Shields contested on the same day, played back-to-back at Wembley Stadium and was televised live on BBC One and BBC iPlayer.

Match

Details

Notes

References

Women's FA Community Shield
Community Shield
Community Shield
Community Shield 
Events at Wembley Stadium
Community Shield